Santosh Kumar Nirala is an Indian politician from Buxar district of Bihar, India. He is serving as Minister of Transport, Bihar since 29 July 2017 and is a former member of Bihar Legislative Assembly representing the Rajpur constituency from 2010 to 2020.

Political career 
Singh made entry into politics in 1992. In 2010 Bihar Legislative Assembly election, he won from Rajpur (Bihar Vidhan Sabha constituency). Again in 2015 Bihar Legislative Assembly election, he won from the same constituency. He also held the position as Minister of SC & ST Welfare Department, Bihar from 2014 to 2017. Currently, he is Minister of Transport Department, Bihar.

References

External links 

State cabinet ministers of Bihar
Janata Dal (United) politicians
Bihar MLAs 2010–2015
Bihar MLAs 2015–2020
1974 births
Living people